Swept Away is a studio album by a quartet led by acoustic bassist Marc Johnson and pianist Eliane Elias, with tenor saxophonist Joe Lovano and drummer Joey Baron. The album was released on September 7, 2012 by ECM Records.

Reception 
Both The Guardian and AllMusic gave the album four stars. In The Guardian, critic John Fordham sees the influence of Bill Evans and Keith Jarrett and praises the album's intimacy. At AllMusic, Rick Anderson calls it "ECM jazz" after ECM Records and the melancholy and spaciousness which are characteristic of many albums in the label's catalogue.

Cormac Larkin of The Irish Times gave the album five stars, stating it was even better than Johnson and Elias's last collaboration, and crediting Elias in particular for "really lift[ing] Swept Away to another level." Phil Johnson of The Independent commented "Bassist Johnson and pianist Elias are partners in life as well as music, and this delightfully dreamy album of 11 songs suggests the domestic scale and unforced intimacy of an interior by the French painter Pierre Bonnard... As sensitive, small-group jazz goes, this is close to definitive." Jeff Tamarkin writing for JazzTimes added, "Although Johnson shares top billing with Elias, his role is largely confined to locking in with Baron and too infrequently unfurling a faultlessly framed solo..."

Track listing
All tracks except for "Shenandoah" were composed by Eliane Elias (1–3, 5, 7, 8, 10) and Marc Johnson (4, 6, 8–10).

"Swept Away" – 6:18
"It's Time" – 5:49
"One Thousand and One Nights" – 8:18
"When the Sun Comes Up" – 6:36
"B Is for Butterfly" – 8:05
"Midnight Blue" – 6:00
"Moments" – 5:50
"Sirens of Titan" – 5:55
"Foujita" – 6:36
"Inside Her Old Music Box" – 5:27
"Shenandoah" – 4:35

Personnel 
 Eliane Elias – piano
 Marc Johnson – double bass
 Joe Lovano – tenor saxophone
 Joey Baron – drums

Chart positions

References

2012 albums
ECM Records albums
Marc Johnson (musician) albums
Eliane Elias albums